Ternate is a language of northern Maluku, eastern Indonesia. Historically, it served as the primary language of the Sultanate of Ternate, famous for its role in the spice trade. It has established itself as a lingua franca of the North Maluku province. A North Halmahera language, it is unlike most languages of Indonesia which belong to the Austronesian language family. 

This language should be distinguished from Ternate Malay (North Moluccan Malay), a local Malay-based creole which it has heavily influenced. Ternate serves as the first language of ethnic Ternateans, mainly in the rural areas, while Ternate Malay is nowadays used as a means of interethnic and trade communication, particularly in the urban part of the island. More recently, there has been a language shift from Ternate towards Malay. It can be assumed that its role as a lingua franca has greatly waned. While the Ternate people are scattered all over eastern Indonesia, it is not known how many expatriate Ternateans still speak the language. In Indonesian, it is generally known as bahasa Ternate; however, the term bahasa Ternate asli is sometimes used to distinguish it from Ternate Malay.

Ternate influence is present in many languages of eastern Indonesia, reaching the languages of central and northern Sulawesi. The language has been influential as a source of lexical and grammatical borrowing for North Moluccan Malay, the local variant of Malay, which has given rise to other eastern Indonesian offshoots of Malay, such as Manado Malay.

Written records
The Ternate language was recorded with the Arabic script since the 15th century, while the Latin alphabet is used in modern writing. Ternate and Tidore are notable for being the only indigenous non-Austronesian languages of the region to have established literary traditions prior to first European contact. Other languages of the North Halmahera region, which were not written down until the arrival of Christian missionaries, have received significant lexical influence from Ternate.

Classification
Ternate is a member of the North Halmahera language family, which is classified by some as part of a larger West Papuan family, a proposed linking of the North Halmahera languages with the Papuan languages of the Bird's Head Peninsula. It is most closely related to the Tidore language, which is native to the southern neighboring island. The distinction between Ternate and Tidore appears to be based on sociopolitical factors rather than linguistic differences. While many authors have described these varieties as separate languages, some classifications identify them as dialects of a single language, collectively termed as either "Ternate" or "Ternate-Tidore".

Phonology
Ternate, like other North Halmahera languages, is not a tonal language.

Consonants

Vowels

References

Languages of Indonesia
North Halmahera languages